Taluku Shamarao Venkannaiah (ತ.ಶಾ.ವೆಂಕಣ್ಣಯ್ಯ) (17 November 1941 – 14 June 2012) was an Indian author and educator. Venkannaiah was born in Shimoga Shimoga district to a native Telugu family. He was named after his father's elder brother T. S. Venkannayya. Residing at Sringeri he had served as principal in JCBM College of Sringeri, Chikmagalur Dist, Karnataka State, South India.

He was a Sanskrit professor in JCBM college Sringeri. He translated many works and was a chief editor of magazines like Bhamathi (JCBM College magazine which won awards for many consecutive years during his time as editor), monthly Sadguru's Blessings of Harihara Pura Mat, and Seva Sadana of Gubbi Chidambarashram for many years. His translations include Will Durant's greatest work the History of Greece volume 9. He served as Sringeri Taluk Kannada Sahitya Parishat president.

Education and career 
Venkannaiah studied his primary and secondary education in Shimoga and later on moved to Mysore for higher studies. He completed his MA in Sanskrit from Mysore University in 1963 and worked as sub-editor in Adult Education Council, Mysore for six months and started his career as a high school teacher in Deshiya Vidyashala from 1964 to 1965. On 8 July 1965 he became a lecturer in JCBM College in Srigeri (the Sharada Peetham). He retired as principal of the same college on 30 November 1999.

Works and message

For his works Venkannaiah was awarded Sahitya Siri by Kannada Sahitya parishat. He was against meaningless practices and rituals, and he was for true understandings of spiritual texts. His words are expressed in his commemoration volume Sahrudayi. Venkannaiah's writings vary from Sanskrit works to English and Telugu works.

Bibliography

Sanskrit to Kannada 
 Sri Shankara's Bhajagovindam with special explanation
 Bharatiyare ecchara: Sri Dayananda sarasvati's Points to Ponder
 Upadesha Shatakam – Poet Gumani
 Six small story collection of Dharma Neeti and Subhashitagalannu
 Guruvamsha Kavya – Sri Kashi Lakshmana Shastri's
 Shrividyeya Sarasarvasva – Mahamanustava – by Kavya Kanta Ganapathi Shastri
 Somadeva's Kathasarithsagara 12–18 chapter translation to Kannada

English to Kannada 
 Adyatmika sanjeevini – Swami Paramananda's Spiritual Healing
 Dhyanada acharane – swami rutajananda's Practice of meditation
 Bharatiyare ecchara – Sri Dayananda sarasvati's Points to Ponder
 Bhavanatmaka prabuddhate – Swami Dayananda sarasvati's Emotional Maturity
 Kristano krishnano – Sri Manoj Rakshit – Christ or Krishna
 Katha Kusuma – Sri Abhinava Vidyatirtha – Edifying parables
 On Avatara Meharbaba's jeevana sadhane mattu upadesha 4 kiruhottigegalu Kannada
 Wildurant's story of civilization 1 – 2 volumes- selected parts translation
 Wildurant's story of civilization 9 vol complete translation
 Ashayagalu mattu munnotagalu – k n munshi views and vistas
 Hindu Adarshagalu – K Balasubrahmanya Aiyyar's – Hindu Ideals
 Eivaru sahodararu – K N Munshi's The Five Brothers Part III

Telugu to Kannada 
 Vedanthaa Kathavali part 1 – Shri Vidyaprakashanandagiri
 Vedantha Kathavali part −2  – Shri Vidyaprakashanandagiri
 Jeevana charitre "Late TS venkannaiah's Life history)
 Sri Sharada Peetha (Introduction to Sringeri Mahasamstana)

Edited works 

 Kavya Pallava Kavana Sankalana Published by Sringeri Kannada Sahitya Parishat
 Seva Vishwa – Gubbi Chidambarashrama Seva Sadana Monthly magazine's 50th years Special edition
 Shatamanada Kavi Kuvempu – Kuvempu janma shatamanotsa's edition)
 Sankeerna – Vakrokti Siddhanta – Ondu Vishleshane (an analysis)
 Vishva Kosha of Mysore University

Other works 

 More than 30 articles in many commemoration volumes and other special editions
 Preface to five Kavana sankalanas, three Katha Sankalanas, three Kadambaris, Bhakti Geethe, and stotra Grantha

Editorial works
 Gubbi "Sevasadana" 10 years since
 "Sadguru's Blessings" – English monthly of Sri hariharapura Temple from 2003 September to April 2011
 For 27 years worked as editor for JCBM College magazine "Bhamati"

Biography
 Sahrudayi (Commemoration volume) (Released on 3 March 2011 on attaining his 70th birthday by Mallepuram G Venkatesh -the first vice chancellor of Sanskrit University and published by Talukina Venkannaiah prakashana and Sharada Prakashana)
 Ta Sha Venkannaiah Marunenapu (Recollecting TSV) on the occasion of his death ceremony

Awards
 Sahitya Siri: On the occasion of 9th district Kannada Sahitya Sammelana on 22 May 2011 at Chikmagalur, Karnataka State, Sri TS Venkannaiah was awarded "Sahitya Siri" in recognition of his service to literature.

See also 
 Father of TS Venkannaiah – TS Shamarao
 Paternal Uncle of TSV Prof T. S. Venkannaiah

References

External links

 Official website of Venkannaiah TS
 JCBM College location
 Sri JCBM sringeri College website
 JCBM college Contact form
 Thalukina Venkannaiah Paternal uncle of TSV 
 Thalukina Mahanubavaru 
 Kuvempu's teacher Taluku Subbanna Venkannaiah
 The legend Talukina Subbanna Venkannaiah
 Talukina Subbanna Venkannaiah

1941 births
Writers from Karnataka
Kannada-language writers
Telugu writers
Educators from Karnataka
20th-century Indian translators
2012 deaths
Sanskrit writers
Indian editors
People from Shimoga
20th-century Indian biographers
20th-century Indian educators